Wiecanowo  is a village in the administrative district of Gmina Mogilno, within Mogilno County, Kuyavian-Pomeranian Voivodeship, in north-central Poland.

Founded by Zdzisław Jankowski in the 1980’s, Wiecanowo became a well-known and popular holiday destination for the surrounding towns such as Mogilno. 

Wiecanowo is known for its beaches to Lake Wiecanowo, summerhouses, sports and leisure.

References

Wiecanowo